The following is the complete filmography of American stand-up comedian, actress, singer, and writer Sarah Silverman.

Film

Television

Comedy specials

Music videos

Video games

References

External links
 

Silverman, Sarah
Silverman, Sarah